Christian Magelssen Ravndal (January 6, 1899 Beirut–October 18, 1984 Vienna, Austria) was an American Career Foreign Service Officer FSO who served as the 2nd Director General of the Foreign Service from May 1, 1947, until June 23, 1949, Ambassador Extraordinary and Plenipotentiary to Uruguay (1949-1951), Hungary (1951-1956), Ecuador (1956-1960), and Czechoslovakia (1960-1961), among many other postings during a prolific career spanning 40+ years.

Early life and family
Christian Ravndal was born in Beirut, Ottoam Empire on January 6, 1899 to Maren Magelssen and G. Bie Ravndal. His father G. Bie (Gabriel) was born in Norway but became a naturalized United States Citizen and was elected to the South Dakota House of Representatives before joining the foreign service. He was serving as US Consul to Beirut at the time of Christian's birth. Christian attended Robert College, and graduated from Luther College College in Iowa, where he was inducted into the schools sport's hall of fame Tennis, joining his father (G. Bie) who had also played Tennis at Luther. Christian served in the Army during World War I before joining the Foreign Service as a code clerk at the U.S. mission in Vienna in 1921. After WWII, he became the second director general of the Foreign Service after being appointed to the position less than two months after Truman unveiled his celebrated foreign policy doctrine to Congress in March 1947. He died at his summer home in Vienna after suffering a series of strokes.

Career
Christian retired in 1961 after 40 years with the State Department, was director general of the Foreign Service from 1947 to 1949, and later served as ambassador to Uruguay, Ecuador and Czechslovakia. He was minister to Hungary from 1951 to 1956.

He joined the Foreign Service as a code clerk at the U.S. mission in Vienna in 1921 and rose to the personal rank of career minister in 1947. When he became director general in 1947, it was his task to reorganize what had been an elite corps into a body that was representative of a cross section of America's population.

Mr. Ravndal was fluent in German, Spanish and Swedish and had a working knowledge of French, Turkish and Hungarian. His style of diplomacy included informal contacts with ordinary people in the countries where he was posted in addition to dealing with government officials.

References 

1899 births
1984 deaths
United States Department of State officials
Ambassadors of the United States to Uruguay
Ambassadors of the United States to Hungary
Ambassadors of the United States to Ecuador
Ambassadors of the United States to Czechoslovakia
Directors General of the United States Foreign Service
Luther College (Iowa) alumni
American expatriates in the Ottoman Empire